Lars Fredrik Händler Svendsen (born 16 September 1970) is a Norwegian philosopher.

Biography
He is a professor in the Department of Philosophy at the University of Bergen, Norway. He is the author of several books, including A Philosophy of Boredom (2005), Fashion: a Philosophy (2006), A Philosophy of Fear (2008), Work (2008), and A Philosophy of Freedom (2014). His books have been translated into more than 25 languages.

Bibliography
2005: A Philosophy of Boredom
2006: Fashion: A Philosophy
2008: A Philosophy of Fear
2008: Work
2010: A Philosophy of Evil Dalkey Archive Press
2014: A Philosophy of Freedom
2017: A Philosophy of Loneliness
2019: Understanding Animals: Philosophy for Dog and Cat Lovers
2022: A Philosophy Of Lying

References

External links
 Review of "A Philosophy of Loneliness" in PopMatters
 Review of "A Philosophy of Freedom" in Notre Dame Philosophical Reviews
 Review of "A Philosophy of Evil" in Financial Times
 Review of "A Philosophy of Fear" in Times Higher Education
 Review of "A Philosophy of Boredom" in The Times
 Review of "A Philosophy of Boredom" in Denver Post
 Review of Lars Fr. H. Svendsen's "Fashion - a philosophy" in Hint Fashion Magazine

1970 births
Living people
Norwegian philosophers
Academic staff of the University of Bergen

http://www.popmatters.com/review/a-philosophy-of-loneliness-by-lars-svendsen/